Verow is a surname. Notable people with the surname include:

Arthur Verow (1942–2019), American politician
Todd Verow (born 1966), American film director